The Gridley Building, built in 1867 and known previously as the Onondaga County Savings Bank Building, is a prominent historic building on Clinton Square and Hanover Square in Syracuse, New York, United States.  It was designed by Horatio Nelson White and was built adjacent to what was then the Erie Canal and is now Erie Boulevard.

History

The address of the Gridley Building is 101 S. Salina Street, according to the 1970 National Register of Historic Places nomination form.  Five years later, the Hanover Square Historic District nomination listed its address as 101 East Water Street.

The Syracuse Savings Bank Building is located directly across Erie Boulevard.

It was listed on the National Register of Historic Places in 1971.

Influence
The architect for Gridley Building, Horatio Nelson White, also designed the Hall of Languages in 1870 with the very similar style. It was the first building on Syracuse University campus, and is often prominently displayed as a representation of the University in many forums.

See also
Syracuse Savings Bank Building
National Register of Historic Places listings in Syracuse, New York

References

External links

Syracuse Then and Now.org: The Gridley Building

Buildings and structures in Syracuse, New York
Onondaga limestone
Bank buildings on the National Register of Historic Places in New York (state)
Historic American Buildings Survey in New York (state)
National Register of Historic Places in Syracuse, New York